The 1974–75 Borussia Mönchengladbach season was the 75th season in club history. The club won a double of the Bundesliga and UEFA Cup.

Review and events
Borussia Mönchengladbach won the double. The club faced 1. FC Köln 5 times during the season which includes two Bundesliga matches, two UEFA Cup matches and one DFB-Pokal match. The club won three, drew twice and lost once against 1. FC Köln.

Squad

Match results

Legend

Bundesliga

League table

DFB-Pokal

UEFA Cup

First round

Second round

Third round

Quarter-final

Semi-final

Final

Player information

Squad and statistics

|}

Sources

Borussia Monchengladbach
Borussia Mönchengladbach seasons
German football championship-winning seasons
UEFA Europa League-winning seasons